Castlewood is a neighborhood in the City of Centennial, Colorado. A former census-designated place (CDP), the population was 25,567 at the 2000 census.  It has been a part of the City of Centennial since the city's incorporation in 2001.

Geography

Demographics

Economy
The headquarters of Blackjack Pizza, by 1999, was in what was then Castlewood CDP.

See also

Outline of Colorado
Index of Colorado-related articles
State of Colorado
Colorado cities and towns
Centennial, Colorado
Colorado counties
Arapahoe County, Colorado
List of statistical areas in Colorado
Front Range Urban Corridor
North Central Colorado Urban Area
Denver-Aurora-Boulder, CO Combined Statistical Area
Denver-Aurora-Broomfield, CO Metropolitan Statistical Area

References

External links

City of Centennial website

Centennial, Colorado
Former census-designated places in Colorado